Andrew H. "Jap" Payne (December 6, 1879 – August 22, 1942) was a baseball player in the Negro leagues. He played multiple positions, including outfield and infield.

Standing at 5-foot-5 inches, Payne was described as "unimposing," but he became known for slapping line drives past infielders, as well as having an excellent arm.

Payne was rumored to have gotten the nickname "Jap" due to his slanted eyes.

In August, 1907, Payne lost his temper and attacked an umpire, causing a near-riot, and his language occasionally forced umpires to throw him out of games.

Sportswriter and fellow player Jimmy Smith put Payne on his 1909 "All American Team." Prior to the 1930 season, pitcher Dizzy Dismukes included Payne in his list of nine greatest all-time outfielders and wrote:

In 1953, future Hall of Famer Pop Lloyd named Payne as the right fielder on his all-time team.

References

External links

1879 births
1942 deaths
Baseball outfielders
Baseball players from Washington, D.C.
Brooklyn Royal Giants players
Chicago American Giants players
Cuban X-Giants players
Leland Giants players
Pennsylvania Red Caps of New York players
Philadelphia Giants players
20th-century African-American people